Richard Henry Gillespie Cunningham III (c.1944–2021) was an American lawyer and politician.

Cunningham's ancestry could be traced back to passengers of the Mayflower. He was born in Brooklyn, New York to parents Frederick William Cunningham and Anna Bent Cunningham and raised in Stamford, Connecticut. Cunningham graduated from Stamford High School in 1962, earned a Bachelor of Science in political science from the Massachusetts Institute of Technology in 1967, alongside a minor in mechanical engineering. He completed his legal studies at Duke Law School in 1970, and began practicing law in Stamford later that year. Between 1971 and 1977, Cunningham was a reservist in the United States Army, assigned to the 399th Civil Affairs Group with the rank of captain. He won election to the Connecticut Senate as a Republican in 1978, defeating 27th district incumbent William Strada. Cunningham lost the seat to Thom Serrani in 1980. The next year, Cunningham defeated incumbent Paul Esposito in a Connecticut House of Representatives election for the 148th district. Cunningham died on July 4, 2021, aged 77.

References

1940s births
2021 deaths
Connecticut lawyers
21st-century American lawyers
20th-century American lawyers
20th-century American politicians
Republican Party members of the Connecticut House of Representatives
Republican Party Connecticut state senators
Massachusetts Institute of Technology alumni
Politicians from Stamford, Connecticut
Duke University School of Law alumni
United States Army reservists